No Hay Imposibles (English: There Are Not Impossibles) is the 14th studio album recorded by Puerto Rican performer Chayanne. This album was released by Sony Music Latin on February 23, 2010 (see 2010 in music).

Track list

Music videos
Si No Estás
Me Enamoré de Tí
Tú Boca

Reception

David Jeffries of Allmusic gave the album a 3.5 out of 5 star rating who felt the album is "still filled with the enthusiasm and conviction" despite the lack of originality by the artist.

Charts

Weekly charts

Year-end charts

Sales and certifications

See also
 List of number-one albums of 2010 (Mexico)
 List of number-one Billboard Latin Pop Albums of 2010
 List of number-one Billboard Latin Albums from the 2010s

References

2010 albums
Chayanne albums
Sony Music Latin albums
Spanish-language albums
Albums produced by Julio Reyes Copello
Albums produced by Sebastian Krys